The Pork Chop Gang was a group of 20 Democratic Party legislators from rural areas of North Florida who worked together to dominate the Florida legislature, especially to maintain segregation and conserve the disproportionate political power of mostly rural northern Florida. The origins of the name are obscure, referring either to a purported divide in the state's cuisine (pork supposedly being preferred in the north and lamb being preferred in the south) or to the legislative pork that the members of the Gang were allegedly awarding themselves. They were active primarily from the 1930s to the 1960s, although the final "nail in their coffin" was in 1977. The spokesperson was Senator Charley Johns. They "had become unusually powerful in the 1950s because the legislative districts of the state had not been redrawn to account for the massive growth of urban areas in earlier years." The key figure in the group, coordinating their activities, although not a legislator, was industrialist Ed Ball. Their favorite haunt was the fish camp of legislator Raeburn C. Horne, at Nutall Rise, in Taylor County on the Aucilla River. The group targeted communists and homosexuals.

Membership
The following legislators were members of the Pork Chop Gang in 1956, according to the captions on a photo of them in the state archives of Florida:

Their public spokesman was Florida Senate President Charley Eugene Johns from Starke. The coalition supported racial segregation (which was practiced at Ball's St. Joe Paper Company, as it was at most companies in Florida at the time).

Activities

For nine years, the Pork Chop Gang, having failed in its investigation of alleged communism in the NAACP, devoted its efforts to identifying homosexuals in Florida universities and schools. "By 1963, more than 39 college professors and deans had been dismissed from their positions at the three state universities, and 71 teaching certificates were revoked." See Homosexuality and Citizenship in Florida, a report prepared by the Florida Legislative Investigation Committee, popularly called the Johns Committee, since it was Johns' legislative project (to get the committee set up) and he was its chair.

Their downfall was the Constitution of 1968, which ended decades of misapportionment that favored rural north Florida over more populated central and south Florida, and eliminated mandatory school segregation. However, it took a new state constitution to get them out.

Professor Judith Poucher called the Johns Committee "Florida's version of McCarthyism".

See also
Mississippi State Sovereignty Commission

References

Further reading
 

 
History of racial segregation in the United States
Florida Legislature
Florida Democrats
History of racism in Florida
Race and law in the United States
North Florida
LGBT in Florida
History of LGBT civil rights in the United States
Political scandals in Florida
Conservatism in the United States
Discrimination against LGBT people in the United States
Anti-communism in the United States